Darkness at Noon is the second studio album by A Hawk and a Hacksaw, released in 2005 on The Leaf Label.

Track listing
All tracks by Jeremy Barnes

 "Laughter in the Dark" – 7:55
 "The Moon Under Water" – 3:59
 "The Water Under the Moon" – 3:52
 "A Black and White Rainbow" – 4:49
 "For Slavoj" – 4:58
 "Europa" – 3:50
 "Pastelka On the Train" – 3:13
 "Goodbye Great Britain" – 1:34
 "Our Lady of the Vlatva" – 1:36
 "Wicky Pocky" – 5:08
 "Portland Town" – 5:16

Personnel 

Jeremy Barnes – Percussion, Accordion, Jew's-Harp, Organ (Hammond), Vocals, Piano (Grand), Cumbus, Piano (Upright)
Dan Clucas – Trumpet, Cornet
Joseph Garcia – Oud
Kristin Kelly – Vocals
Heather Trost – Violin, Vocals
Barbara Burgio - Vocals
Horacio Samaniego - Flute
Mark Weaver - Tuba

Trivia
The album's title, Darkness at Noon, is a reference to the Arthur Koestler novel of the same name.
 The first track, "Laughter in the Dark", is a reference to the Vladimir Nabokov novel of the same name.

References

2005 albums
A Hawk and a Hacksaw albums
The Leaf Label albums